Breviraja, commonly known as lightnose skates, is a genus of small skates in the family Rajidae. They are found in deep water of the western Atlantic, including the Gulf of Mexico.

Species
 Breviraja claramaculata McEachran & Matheson, 1985 (Brightspot skate)
 Breviraja colesi Bigelow & Schroeder, 1948 (Lightnose skate)
 Breviraja marklei McEachran & Miyake, 1987 (Nova Scotia Skate)
 Breviraja mouldi McEachran & Matheson, 1995 (Blacknose Skate)
 Breviraja nigriventralis McEachran & Matheson, 1985 (Blackbelly skate)
 Breviraja spinosa Bigelow & Schroeder, 1950 (Spinose skate)

References
 
 

Rajiformes
Ray genera
Taxa named by Henry Bryant Bigelow
Taxa named by William Charles Schroeder